Doern is a surname. Notable people with the surname include:

 George Philip Doern (1829–1878), American newspaperman
 Russell Doern (1935–1987), Canadian politician

See also
 Dern
 Dorn